Nate Robinson (born 1984) is an American basketball player.

Nate Robinson may also refer to:

Nate Robinson (American football) (born 1985), American football player who has played in the National Football League
Nate Robinson (soccer) (born 1990), American soccer player
Nate Robinson (Emmerdale), a fictional character from Emmerdale

See also
Nathan Robinson (ice hockey) (born 1981), Canadian ice hockey player
Robinson (name)